The Aifer Transan is a Spanish powered parachute, designed and produced by Airfer Paramotores.

Design and development
The aircraft was designed to comply with the Fédération Aéronautique Internationale microlight rules. It features a parachute-style high-wing and two seats in tandem in an open framed structure, tricycle landing gear and a single  Hirth engine in pusher configuration. The Transan was also available powered by a Rotax 503, Hirth 2702 and 2703 engines.

Variants
Airfer Trike Monoplaza
Single-seat light-weight variant.
Airfer Trike Biplaza
Tandem two-seater
Airfer Tranan
Tandem two-seater
Airfer Transam 2702
Tandem two-seater with a Hirth 2702 engine.

Specifications (Transan)

References

External links

Transan
2000s Spanish ultralight aircraft
Single-engined pusher aircraft
Powered parachutes